Charles Anderson (October 24, 1914 – March 27, 1993) was an American equestrian who won a gold medal for eventing at the 1948 Summer Olympics.

References

1914 births
1993 deaths
American event riders
American male equestrians
Olympic gold medalists for the United States in equestrian
Equestrians at the 1948 Summer Olympics
Medalists at the 1948 Summer Olympics